The Old Burying Ground, also known as Walnut Street Cemetery, was the first cemetery established in Brookline, Massachusetts, in 1717.  It was the town's only cemetery for 140 years until the establishment of the Holyhood Cemetery in 1857, and the Walnut Hills Cemetery in 1875. The cemetery is part of the Brookline Town Green Historic District.

Notable interments
 Francis C. Barlow (1834–1896), Civil War general
 Zabdiel Boylston (1679–1766), physician and surgeon
 Amanda M. Edmond (1824–1862), poet
 Barnas Sears (1802–1880), President of Brown University

References

External links
 
 
 Burials and Inscriptions in the Walnut Street Cemetery of Brookline, Massachusetts
 

Buildings and structures in Brookline, Massachusetts
Historic districts in Norfolk County, Massachusetts
Cemeteries in Norfolk County, Massachusetts
Tourist attractions in Brookline, Massachusetts
1717 establishments in the Thirteen Colonies
Buildings and structures completed in 1717
Cemeteries established in the 18th century